The 2010–11 Welsh Football League Division Three began on 1 September 2010 and ended on 28 May 2011. Monmouth Town won the league by two points.

Caerau claimed third spot on the final day of the season. Requiring an 11-goal victory, they beat Treowen Stars 13–0 to take the final promotion spot on goal difference ahead of Goytre and Pontypridd Town.

Team changes from 2009–10
Treowen Stars were promoted from the Gwent County League and Caerau were promoted from the South Wales Amateur League.

Seven Sisters were relegated to the Neath & District League. Llantwit Fardre and Troedyrhiw were relegated to the South Wales Amateur League. Garw and Pentwyn Dynamo were relegated to the South Wales Senior League.

Aberbargoed Buds, Abertillery Bluebirds and Cwmaman Institute were promoted to the Welsh Football League Division Two.

Cardiff Grange Harlequins, Cwmbran Town, Llanwern, Porthcawl Town Athletic, Tredegar Town and UWIC were relegated from the Welsh Football League Division Two.

League table

Results

External links
 Welsh Football League

Welsh Football League Division Three seasons
4